Sarmastani is a Baloch tribe settled in Balochistan, Pakistan. The tribe came to Balochistan from the Caspian region of Sarmastan, Iran, and under this name they were one of the allies of Ameer Bijjar Mirwani, in Brahao Jadgal War, and later they derived their tribal name from their heroic ancestor; Sardar Sarmad, who was a blacksmith by profession. This group is as old as other groups of Baloch community. It came to Balochsitan along with other Baloch tribes in 853 B.C.  When Ameer Meeru Mirawani Baloch formed the Baloch state and Baloch council and laid the foundation of National Army, it was felt that there should be weapon making workshops for the provision of weapons for National Army. Since the group of weapon makers was already present, Ammer Meeru appointed the Sardar (headman) of Blacksmith tribe namely Sardar Sarmast s/o Mubarak as Director General (D.G) of Central weapon making workshop. Likewise the Deputy Lords of Makran, Kharan, Lasbela and Chagai also made weapon making workshops in their states to meet the needs of their local Armies. Afterwards, in attribution with the name of D.G of Central weapon making workshop, the all blacksmiths got fame as Sarmastani in Balochistan and are still known as Sarmastani tribe in Baloch society. This tribe rendered valuable services for the defense of baloch land during wars as weapon makers and during peace as tool makers for agriculture. They worked generation after generation as Director Generals of weapon making workshops from 1410 AD to 1839 AD. This group of weapon makers is commonly called Aain Kaar (Blacksmiths) and their headmen are called Ustakar. In ancient times, they made conventional weapons, for example bow and arrow, guns, spears, axes, daggers, bludgeons, catapults, and cannons.

Their name implies a connection with the historical Sarmatians tribes of the Caucasus.

References

Baloch tribes